In linguistics and semiotics, a notation is a system of graphics or symbols, characters and abbreviated expressions, used (for example) in artistic and scientific disciplines to represent technical facts and quantities by convention. Therefore, a notation is a collection of related symbols that are each given an arbitrary meaning, created to facilitate structured communication within a domain knowledge or field of study.

Standard notations refer to general agreements in the way things are written or denoted. The term is generally used in technical and scientific areas of study like mathematics, physics, chemistry and biology, but can also be seen in areas like business, economics and music.

Written communication

Writing systems
 Phonographic writing systems, by definition, use symbols to represent components of auditory language, i.e. speech, which in turn refers to things or ideas. The two main kinds of phonographic notational system are the alphabet and the syllabary. Some written languages are more consistent in their correlation of written symbols (or graphemes) with sound (or phonemes), and are therefore considered to have better phonemic orthography.
 Ideographic writing, by definition, refers to things or ideas independently of their pronunciation in any language. Some ideographic systems are also pictograms that convey meaning through their pictorial resemblance to a physical object.

Linguistics
 Various brackets, parentheses, slashes, and lines are used around words and letters in linguistics to distinguish written from spoken forms, etc. See .

Biology and medicine
 Nucleic acid notation
 Systems Biology Graphical Notation (SBGN)
 Sequence motif pattern-description notations
 Cytogenetic notation
 Energy Systems Language

Chemistry
 SMILES is a notation for describing the structure of a molecule with a plain text string, e.g. N=N for nitrogen or CCO for ethanol

Computing
 BNF (Backus normal form, or Backus–Naur form) and EBNF (extended Backus-Naur form) are the two main notation techniques for context-free grammars.
 Drakon-charts are a graphical notation of algorithms and procedural knowledge.
 Hungarian notation is an identifier naming convention in computer programming, that represents the type or intended use of a variable with a specific pattern within its name. 
 Mathematical markup languages are computer notations for representing mathematical formulae.
 Various notations have been developed to specify regular expressions.
 The  APL programming language  provided a rich set of very concise new notations

Logic
A variety of symbols are used to express logical ideas; see the List of logic symbols

Management
 Time and motion study symbols such as therbligs

Mathematics
Mathematical notation is used to represent various kinds of mathematical ideas.
 All types of notation in probability
 Cartesian coordinate system, for representing position and other spatial concepts in analytic geometry
 Notation for differentiation, common representations of the derivative in calculus
 Big O notation, used for example in analysis to represent less significant elements of an expression, to indicate that they will be neglected
 Z notation, a formal notation for specifying objects using Zermelo–Fraenkel set theory and first-order predicate logic
 Ordinal notation
 Set-builder notation, a formal notation for defining sets in set theory
 Systems to represent very large numbers
 Conway chained arrow notation 
 Knuth's up-arrow notation 
 Steinhaus–Moser notation
 Schläfli symbol in geometry
 Numeral systems, notation for writing numbers, including
 Arabic numerals
 Roman numerals
 Scientific notation for expressing large and small numbers
 Sign-value notation, using signs or symbols to represent numbers
 Positional notation also known as place-value notation, in which each position is related to the next by a multiplier which is called the base of that numeral system
 Binary notation, a positional notation in base two
 Octal notation, a positional notation in base eight, used in some computers
 Decimal notation, a positional notation in base ten
 Hexadecimal notation, a positional notation in base sixteen, commonly used in computers
 Sexagesimal notation, an ancient numeral system in base sixty
 See also Table of mathematical symbols - for general tokens and their definitions...

Physics
 Bra–ket notation, or Dirac notation, is an alternative representation of probability distributions in quantum mechanics.
 Tensor index notation is used when formulating physics (particularly continuum mechanics, electromagnetism, relativistic quantum mechanics and field theory, and general relativity) in the language of tensors.

Typographical conventions
 Infix notation, the common arithmetic and logical formula notation, such as "a + b − c".
 Polish notation or "prefix notation", which places the operator before the operands (arguments), such as "+ a b".
 Reverse Polish notation or "postfix notation", which places the operator after the operands, such as "a b +".

Sports and games
 Baseball scorekeeping, to represent a game of baseball
 Aresti Catalogue, to represent aerobatic manoeuvres
 Chess notation, to represent moves in a game of chess
 Algebraic notation
Portable Game Notation
 Descriptive notation
 Forsyth–Edwards Notation
 Siteswap notation represents a juggling pattern as a sequence of numbers

Graphical notations

Music
 Musical notation permits a composer to express musical ideas in a musical composition, which can be read and interpreted during performance by a trained musician; there are many different ways to do this (hundreds have been proposed), although staff notation provides by far the most widely used system of modern musical symbols.

Dance and movement
 Benesh Movement Notation permits a graphical representation of human bodily movements
 Laban Movement Analysis or Labanotation permits a graphical representation of human bodily movements
 Eshkol-Wachman Movement Notation permits a graphical representation of bodily movements of other species in addition to humans, and indeed any kind of movement (e.g. aircraft aerobatics)
 Juggling diagrams represent juggling patterns
 Aresti aerobatic symbols provides a way to represent flight maneuvers in aerobatics

Science
 Feynman diagrams permit a graphical representation of a perturbative contribution to the transition amplitude or correlation function of a quantum mechanical or statistical field theory
 Structural formulas are graphical representations of molecules
 Venn diagrams shows logical relations between a finite collection of sets.
 Drakon-charts are a graphical representation of algorithms and procedural knowledge.

Other systems
 Whyte notation for classifying steam locomotives by wheel arrangement

See also 
 Abuse of notation
 Cognitive dimensions of notations
 Formal notation
 Secondary notation

References

Further reading 

 
 

 
Written communication
Modeling languages